The Fourstardave Handicap is a Grade I American Thoroughbred horse race for horses that are three years old or older over a distance of one mile on the turf course scheduled annually in August at Saratoga Race Course in Saratoga Springs, New York. The event currently carries a purse of $500,000.

History

The event was inaugurated on 31 July 1985, Opening Day of the Saratoga meeting for that year as the Daryl's Joy Stakes at a distance of  miles and was won by Roving Minstrel who was ridden by United States' Racing Hall of Fame jockey Ángel Cordero Jr. in a time of 1:45.  The New Zealand-bred Daryl's Joy was a Two Year Champion in 1968 there, and after a successful spring campaign in Australia in 1969 winning the W. S. Cox Plate and Victoria Derby the colt was sold to the US where he won six races in eleven starts for United States' Racing Hall of Fame trainer Charles E. Whittingham.

Early winners of the event won even more important events and the status of the race grew in importance. In 1988 the event was classified as Grade III.  The winner of the First Division of the split divisions in 1989, the British bred horse Steinlen later that year would win the Breeders' Cup Mile. In 1990 and 1991, the New York State bred Fourstardave won the race.

In 1995 New York Racing Association renamed the event to The Fourstardave,  nicknamed "The Sultan of Saratoga" because he won at least one race at the Saratoga track each year from 1987 to 1994. Fourstardave died of a heart attack in October 2002 at the age of 17 and is buried in Clare Court at Saratoga Race Course. This is a rare honor since only three horses are buried there.

In 2012 the distance of the event was decreased from  miles to one mile.

The event was upgraded to Grade II in 2000 and achieving Grade I status in 2016.

The race was moved off the turf to dirt in 1992 and 2002 due to weather conditions. In 2002 the grade of the event was lowered due to the change of surface as designated by the Thoroughbred Owners and Breeders Association.

In the 2014 renewal, Seek Again set a Saratoga course record in the event which was broken again in 2019 by the mare Got Stormy, who is the only mare to have won the race. In 2021 Got Stormy won the event again at odds of 12-1.

Several horses who have won this event became celebrated champions. The 1993 winner Lure went on to win the Breeders' Cup Mile later in the year also the 1996 winner Da Hoss went on to win the Breeders' Cup Mile later. Both horses were two-time winners of the Breeders' Cup Mile.  The 2005 Brazilian bred winner Leroidesanimaux would become US Champion Male Turf Horse. Dual winner  Wise Dan would become US Horse of the Year in both 2012 and 2013 the years he won of the event. The last horse to win the event and the Breeders' Cup Mile was the champion World Approval in 2017.

Records
Speed  record: 
1 mile: Got Stormy (2019) – 1:32.00
 miles: Fourstardave (1991) – 1:38.80

Most wins:
 2 – Fourstardave (1990, 1991)
 2 – Wise Dan (2012, 2013)
 2 – Got Stormy (2019, 2021)

Most wins by a jockey:
 9 – John R. Velazquez (1992, 1996, 2001, 2004, 2005, 2008, 2011, 2012, 2013)

Most wins by a trainer:
 5 – William I. Mott (2000, 2007, 2014, 2016, 2022)

Most wins by an owner:
 2 – Fernwood Sable (1986, 1987)
 2 – Frances A. Genter (1987, 1988)
 2 – Richard Bomze & Bernard Connaughton (1990, 1991)
 2 – Juddmonte Farms (1992, 2014)
 2 – Darley Stable (2003, 2009)
 2 – WinStar Farm (2011, 2016)
 2 – Morton Fink (2012, 2013)

Winners

Legend:

 
 

Notes:

§ Ran as an entry

ƒ Filly or Mare

See also
 List of American and Canadian Graded races

References

Graded stakes races in the United States
Grade 1 stakes races in the United States
Open mile category horse races
Horse races in New York (state)
Turf races in the United States
Saratoga Race Course
Recurring sporting events established in 1985
1985 establishments in New York (state)